Waray-Waray gangs (also known as Waray-Waray groups) are generic terms used in the Philippines to denote of criminal groups who are of Waray ethnicity. They originated from provinces Leyte and Samar where the majority are of Waray background, later spreading into Luzon. Most of their criminal activities involved armed robberies, but various other gangs have also dabbled in kidnapping, carnapping, gun running, assassinations, gang warfare, and narcotics sale. Their bloody confrontations with the police made them the most notorious gang in the Philippines.

History
Although Waray-speaking criminals have been documented in Luzon since the 1990s, it wasn't until 1997 where they first started being called Waray-Waray gangs. In that year, a Waray-Waray gang kidnapped Chinese-Filipino Virgilio and Christine Chua and their maid Analyn Simbajon. The case was dubbed by the Movement for Restoration of Peace and Order (MRPO) as the longest trial in the history of kidnap-for-ransom cases in the country. In 2001, a policeman by the name of Superintendent Eugenio Casalme was killed by a Waray-Waray gang during a hold-up of a bus on route to Pampanga. He was one of the passengers at that time, and when the gang members noticed his police uniform, they shot him in the chest and neck. In 2002, the house of actor and future politician Sonny Parsons was burglarized by a Waray-Waray gang. They tied him and his own family in their house and almost raped his two daughters. The actor managed to trick the gang into thinking that patrolmen were roaming around the neighborhood, which would make their escape more difficult if they stayed longer. As the gang hastily retreated, Parson got off his bindings, grabbed a pistol and shot at the suspects as they were escaping, killing three of them.

In one of the bloodiest robberies in Philippine history, the Waray-Abuyog Gang shot and killed three policemen and a traffic enforcer on April 13, 2002. An unknown van parked itself in the vicinity of a community precinct in Meycauayan, Bulacan, in which a group of armed men wearing military uniforms came out. The gunmen started firing their assault rifles on the police station, killing some while wounding and scattering the others before escaping in their van. Investigators later found out that this was just a diversion. The robbers were actually robbing a large jewelry store in downtown Meycauayan, but they first attacked the precinct not only to take out the cops inside that might respond to the robbery, but also to lure the other policemen into this area while they escape with the loot. Many were killed and captured afterwards a month later.

In 2003–2004, Waray-Waray kidnap gangs started targeting prominent Chinese-Filipino businessmen in several kidnapping cases. Victims include businesswoman Dominga Chu, and Coca-Cola Export Corp. finance manager Betti Chua Sy. The latter died from her injuries while in custody of the gang. A 10-year-old named Martin Guevarra was also kidnapped by gang leader Arnel Suellen. Six more abductions took place, in which each of the families paid P2 million in ransom. At this time, the National Bureau of Investigation named them "the most active kidnap gang in the country", and even got to the point where President Gloria Macapagal Arroyo herself ordered a new crackdown after their series of kidnappings for ransom. Many of these gang members were from Jaro, Leyte. The same year also saw a gunfight between members of a Waray group known as the Sudoy-Sudoy Gang, and the combined forces of the Central Police District (CPD) and a Special Weapons And Tactics (SWAT) team. Five gang members were killed. They were responsible for a P9-million robbery of an armored van robbery on April 5 at the SM City Annex on North EDSA in Quezon City.

In 2006, Noel Enacmal, leader of the Waray-Waray Kidnap For Ransom (KFR), was captured in Barangay Mali, San Mateo, Rizal. He and his group were responsible for the abduction of some 20 people and a string of armed robberies, such as the kidnapping of Betti Chua Sy and the P60,000 payroll robbery in Cubao, Quezon City.

Bloodiest years

2008 was the bloodiest year committed by the gangs. In Laguna Hills Subdivision, Rizal, three Waray-Waray gang members were killed in a shootout followed by three other more who were captured. This specific gang was notorious for highway robberies, extortion, “akyat-bahay” and the sale of illegal drugs. Additionally, six Waray gang members were killed in a confrontation with the police in Tondo, Manila. Two civilians were also killed in the shootout. In December of that year, a Waray-Waray gang fought the police in a running gun battle in a subdivision in Parañaque that led to the deaths of 16 people. The police were tailing the criminals in a suburb when suddenly, the latter started firing M16 rifles fitted with grenade launchers. Twelve gang members, a Special Action Force personnel, a barangay tanod and two civilians including a 7-year-old girl, were killed. On the same year, two unidentified members of a Waray robbery gang were killed early morning in an encounter with policemen in Caloocan. The unit who fought the gang was composed of NCR-CIDG, ISAFP, and Caloocan police. Chief Senior Supt. Isagani Nerez believed that the group was also involved in the recent gunbattle Parañaque, as well as an armored van robbery in the University of the Philippines.

In 2009, the Waray-Ozamiz Gang robbed a Malaysian national named William Yeo, who owned a moneychanger shop in Ermita, Manila. Three of them were later captured by the police, and among the weapons recovered were two undocumented .45 caliber pistols, a .9mm Intratec machine pistol, M-16 Baby Armalite, two 12-gauge shotguns, three fragmentation grenades, six rifle grenades and two M203 40mm grenade launcher. In 2011, Parañaque witnessed another shootout in a middle-class subdivision where three members of a Waray-Waray robbery gang and a policeman were killed. The year 2012 saw the murder of Robert Edward Armstrong, an American tourist, during a 7/11 robbery that was committed by a Waray-Waray gang. The American was killed as he tried to escape. The police retaliated by killing 3 Waray criminals in separate shootouts, and arresting 5 more, with alleged help from Federal Bureau of Investigation agents.

In November 2012, two Waray-Waray gangsters were killed in a shootout with the PNP-CIDG in San Fernando, Pampanga. In 2013, two leaders of a Waray-Waray robbery group were captured by the NBI in the same city. They were responsible for a series of robberies of banks and moneychanger shops as well as murder. Another leader, Noli del Monti from Samar, escaped. On the same year, three members of the Ozamis-Waray-Waray group were killed during a shootout with law enforcement in a police checkpoint in Quezon City. Police said an intelligence report revealed that the three were planning to rob a pawnshop after a failed attempt to carry out an abduction.

Philippine Drug War
By 2014 however, congressmen submitted House Bill No. 3691 which would make it illegal to name gangs after ethnicity, place, or religion due to racism. However, the name and gangs of Waray ethnicity still persisted. In 2015 for example, Waray-Waray gang leader Jobert Española was murdered by unknown assailants in Binondo, Manila. He was once convicted of killing policeman SPO2 Nestor Dela Cruz. The year 2017 saw the individual capture of two Waray-Waray gang members in Caloocan and Valenzuela. This particular group had robbed two Indian nationals, and a Colt M1911 was recovered on one of them.

However, there has been a resurgence in modern times of criminals and gangs who were inspired, and took their name, from previous Waray-Waray gangs. This include a local vigilante gang from Tacloban known as OG Imba: Waray-Waray Gang, who became infamous for their gang warfare. They were also one of the premiere vigilante groups in Rodrigo Duterte's War on Drugs. In 2018, remnant Waray gangs were reported by Chief Supt. Edward Caranza as gun-for-hire that targeted local chief executives and potential political candidates. Six of them were killed in a shootout with the police in a buy-bust operation during the height of the Philippine Drug War, in Barangay San Isidro, Rodriguez town of Rizal. They were also involved in carnapping and robbery cases.

A number of Waray criminals were targeted between the years 2019-2020 starting with the killing of Jason Cada on June 3, 2019. A year later, SPO3 Francisco Homeres Jr. was killed in an ambush in Abucay. August 2020 became the bloodiest month of the year, with five murders including former policemen. Those killed include Jason Golong, Pio Peñaflor and his son Alphy Peñaflor, Dennis Monteza and Constantino Torre. On the night of December 5, 2020, two members of a Waray-Waray group were killed in a police operation in Quezon City. The members were part of a gun-running and gun-for-hire group who also partake in drug-dealing and kidnapping. One of those killed, Jhonny Radaza, was a former convict. A month later, four more members were killed in a rescue operation with the police after kidnapping a Chinese national.

Ties to the Philippine Army
Some of the members of the Waray-Waray gangs were former or active soldiers of the Philippine Army, including Eliseo Barres, Alfredo Mondares and Army Cpl. Pelagio Royera. It even came to the point where the police started investigating whether the army and the gangs have ties to each other due to the amount of high-caliber weapons and explosives recovered from these gangs. Most members however, were only thugs who had street training.

Infamous gangs
Many Waray-Waray gangs are differentiated from each other through unique names, primary activities, ethnicity or place of origin. Some of the most notorious are:
 Waray-Waray Kidnap-For-Ransom Gang (aka Waray-Waray KDP)
 Waray-Abuyog Gang
 Waray-Ozamis Gang
 Sudoy-Sudoy Gang
 OG Imba

Legacy
The heyday of the Waray-Waray gangs gave birth to the negative stereotypical belief in the Philippines that the Waray people are a violent ethnic group compared to others. In an opinion column for a newspaper written on July 25, 2011, Prof. Gerry B. De Cadiz of the Eastern Visayas State University condemned the actions of the Waray-Waray gangs and their effect on the image of the Waray people. He stated, "Much to our embarrassment, being brave or mag-isog has been perceived by the nation to be associated with brutality, callousness and getting involved in criminality.  So that the periodic broadcast in national networks and publication in widely-circulated broadsheets of the notorious activities of the so-called Waray-Waray Gang moulded an image so repulsive and damaging to the dignity of both prominent and ordinary Waray."

The popular ABS-CBN show S.O.C.O.: Scene of the Crime Operatives aired an episode in December 2016 entitled "SOCO: Waray Abuyog Gang Strikes Terror in Meycauayan, Bulacan" that depicted the bloody shootout and heist in Meycauayan. The Parañaque shootout was featured in an episode of Case Unclosed entitled "The December Shootout". The 2000 action film Waray starring Gary Estrada, Daisy Reyes and Gino Antonio depicted a Waray-Waray gang. It told the story of a group of young Waray in South Manila who came to the city in search of a better life. The film depicted them as being daring and defiant who often rob to help the poor, creating themselves an image of modern-day Robin Hoods. On one faithful day, they made the mistake of kidnapping the daughter of a powerful politician who owned a private army, which led to shootouts and killings between the two parties.

References

See also
 Illegal firearm trade in the Philippines

Philippine Drug War
Organized crime groups in the Philippines
Filipino robbers
Street gangs
Military history of the Philippines
Gangs in the Philippines